The Gathering is an allegorical Australian young adults' novel written by fantasy author Isobelle Carmody. The book was published by Puffin Books Australia in 1993, The Gathering has sold over 70 000 copies in Australia and New Zealand alone.  The book was a joint recipient of the 1993 Children's Peace Literature Award and was also named Book of the Year in 1994 by the Children's Book Council of Australia. In 1994, the novel was also integrated into the literature curriculum for the junior years of Secondary Education in the Australian state of Victoria.

Plot summary
The novel is narrated by Nathanial Delaney, a teenage boy with a self-confessed Hamlet complex and social ineptitude, which can be credited to his lack of a stable environment; he and his mother have been moving frequently since the divorce of his parents. Their most recent home is the seaside town of Cheshunt, an apparently quiet community that Nathanial immediately dislikes, citing the town's bitter wind and abattoir stench as the primary reasons. His resentment causes tension between him and his mother, and their relationship becomes more strained as the story goes on.

Many themes are portrayed in this novel including good vs evil, inner struggle, human nature, conformity vs individuality, friendship and cooperation.

Nathanial soon discovers that there is more to dislike about the town than the smell. The school, Three North High, is victimised by its brutish student patrol, which is under the orders of the vice principal. Mr Karle "invites" Nathanial to join the school's youth group, The Gathering. He believes strongly in cooperation, and hence does not encourage individualism. Nathanial declines to join The Gathering, which becomes an issue with the school patrol.

While walking his dog one night, Nathanial accidentally stumbles on a meeting of a group of three students from Three North: Danny Odin, Indian Mahoney and Nissa Jerome. A fourth member is not present, a school prefect, Seth Paul. The group are known as The Chain, and they tell Nathanial they have been brought together by the "forces of light" to fight a deep evil in Cheshunt, an evil headed by Mr Karle (whom they refer to as "The Kraken"). When Nathanial is caught and questioned by The Chain, they are all informed by the group's prophetic guide, Lallie, that Nathanial is the final of the chosen members of their clan and his arrival heralds the beginning of their battle.

Throughout the novel Nathanial overcomes his cynicism and begins seeing signs of The Dark everywhere, most centrally in the past; in studying the history of Cheshunt he uncovers many parallels between his situation and past events. Throughout the story he also gradually learns that each of his fellow members have deep personal demons, and his role in The Chain and the Binding of the Dark becomes clear in the final chapters, where the grand showdown between The Dark and The Light takes place.

Major themes

Good versus evil
The most obvious theme of the novel, as cited by readers and critics, is that of good versus evil. The issue is dealt with by examining the concept of evil as a malevolent force existing outside of human action from the view point of a character largely defined by logic and rationality. Such an approach creates an air of realism in what is essentially a fantastical plot. The questioning nature of the protagonist (Nathanial), coupled with the story's revelations about the pasts of the town and of the other central characters, also help steer the novel clear of simplistic notions and raise more philosophical questions about the nature of humankind.

Depiction of evil

It is concluded by the novel's end that the town of Cheshunt was not only a place that harboured "evil" as a force, but had been "scarred" by evil as a choice and consequence of mankind, perpetuating a sort of vicious circle. This theory extends the fundamental theme of Good Vs Evil beyond both the concept of Good and Evil as two separate, mutually exclusive forces of life and the more humanistic concept of both good and evil as components of human nature by incorporating these two ideas into one. It is perhaps this device that contributed to the books popularity amongst children, as it depicts the world with both childlike simplicity and mature, analytical complexity.

It is suggested within this book that evil, like history, has a habit of repeating itself. This is shown through the evil that once grew in Cheshunt many years ago, when the town's old caretaker died (a significant plot point). The presence of Lallie, who seems to be some kind of spiritual being rather than a physical person, hints that it is recognized by some kind of greater consciousness that evil will repeat itself and something terrible will happen again.

Existentialism

Definition: a philosophical theory emphasizing the existence of the individual as a free and responsible agent determining his or her own development.

A thematically significant point of the story development takes place in Chapter 16, when Nathanial learns that Danny, a member of The Chain, was a victim of police brutality many years ago. Later the saying "Power corrupts, and absolute power corrupts absolutely" is aptly used in reference to the story, which involved police officers letting savage dogs loose on Danny to force him to give them information that was false. His story's conclusion and climax had one of the police officers that had attacked him visit Danny's school for a talk to improve citizen-authority relations, at the end of which the officer gave Danny a wink:

When he winked, it all came clear to me. I realised everything that happened was a joke. I had been thinking that what happened with the police was wrong, waiting for something to happen to make it right. But when he winked, I realised nothing was going to make it right. That's life. Nothing made sense but to stay alive – survive. Justice. Right and wrong, it was all bullshit that people made up.

- (page 122)

This quote and the opinion expressed in it is somewhat jarring with the rest of the novel's message, as it flatly denies the existence of both good and evil, crediting them to existential inventions of mankind to put order in the world. This reflects the philosophical belief known as nihilism. At the same time, it shows an acknowledgement on Carmody's part of philosophies outside of the key one that the story presents. The theory is, however, later rebuffed by the very same character that put it forward, as it doesn't make sense in the context of the novel:

You could tell he really believed that but there was something wrong about what he was saying. Something that didn't jell. And I thought of Lallie's warning to Danny. She had told him not to let the dark flame of the past consume the future.
"Lallie and the Chain? That's about right winning out over wrong." Danny grinned at me, an engaging urchin's and in spite of being horrified over what he had told me I found myself smiling back. "Yeah well, I'm an idealist."

- (page 123)

Personal demons

To reach a more personal, relatable level with this broad theme, Carmody uses the inner turmoil of Nathanial to mirror the novel's grand struggle between Light and Dark. The recurring theme of his father, who haunts Nathanial's nightmares as a violent monster, strikes an unsettling note of uncertainty within the character about his own nature; he wonders whether he himself is a violent monster. He sees reflections of this in even his academic studies, citing Hamlet as an example of how "thinkers rarely act, but when they do, they are capable of terrible carnage."The other Chain members all also have personal demons to overcome that somehow reflect the central struggle and also could be credited as the reasons they became involved in that struggle to begin with.
 
 Nathanial Delaney is subconsciously tormented by the memory of his violent father. He is 15 years old. He and his mother moved to Cheshunt and attends Three North High School, which is where most of the evil planning takes place. He is the main character and is the eye of completion. He also likes fellow "Chain" member Nissa Jerome. He is the circle/ring of time.

Danny Odin, as previously explained, has been a victim of police brutality. He is the torch of justice.

Nissa Jerome, the hardened and guarded wild orphan girl, is revealed to have had her heart broken as a young girl by one of her desirable mother's many boyfriends, who had claimed to be in love with her and then rejected and humiliated her. Viciously and emotionally damaged, she effectively "closed up" and never let anybody become even remotely attached to her from there on in: "I made a vow to myself then, that I'd never love anyone again. Not like that. From then on, I relied on nobody and took care of myself." (page 182) She is the sword of strength.

Indian ("Homer" in the American version), whose real name is Frank, a young man with a pony tail and a strong build, is revealed to be a literal pacifist because of an eternal guilt that he bears over the brain damage his younger sister sustained under his supervision many years ago. He refuses to retaliate when provoked and especially assaulted, as he feels that he retains no right to defend himself: "I don't fight back because I deserve to be hurt. Because of Jenny. That's my punishment." (page 158). He is the bowl of healing.

Seth Paul, the least central member of The Chain, is described frequently as "perfect", in many respects: personality, physical features, academic, sporting and social achievements. It is this very reputation, and the pressure induced by it, that is his deepest burden: Seth is a hopeless alcoholic, blindly alienated, emotionally weak and without any concernable self-esteem. He is apparently, and unrequitedly in love with Nissa and in Chapter 18 he attempts to commit suicide.

His father is the head of the Cheshunt Police Division and reports to Mr. Karle. Seth is consequently under consistent pressure to side with his father and join the Dark, which he ultimately does, but at the last minute redeems himself, to the prompting and forgiveness of The Chain. He is the eye that seeks.

Fascism and World Society References
Despite exploration into the nature of evil in philosophical and fantasy terms, Carmody's depiction of evil as an authoritarian dictatorship society is very realistic and socially significant and more than one or two parallels can be drawn with such societies as Nazi Germany. Comparisons such as these are even specifically referenced in the book; for example, where Nathanial, enraged at his mother for calling the police on him, tells her "they acted like Nazis!" (page 59). While the ideas of evil in The Gathering do not involve the systematic extermination of any one people, the intimation of a society ruled strictly and brutally by one dictator is integral to the story's stress on the importance of individualism and independent thought in modern civilisation.

Career
In 1987, Carmody began writing her epic fantasy series, the Obernewtyn Chronicles, set in a post-apocalyptic realm of social disarray. While her principal focus still remains on society, in many forms, The Gathering was the first of her novels to be set in a time and place that exist in reality (early '90s Australia), an approach that immediately gives it a stark realism. Another unusual technique used in the book is that of an author narrating their story from the perspective of a member of the opposite gender (see the Tomorrow series, by John Marsden). There were no wide criticisms of her choice to do so; the voice of Nathanial was not, strangely, targeted as being unauthentic. These two basic writing techniques set The Gathering apart from almost any of Carmody's other work.

Awards and nominations

 Joint winner – Children's Peace Literature Award: Best Book (1993)
 Won – CBCA Children's Book of the Year Award: Older Readers (1994)
 Shortlisted – NSW 3M Talking Book Award (1994)
 Second place – Western Australia Young Readers Book Award (1994)
 Shortlisted – Kids Own Australia Literature Award (1995)
 Shortlisted – Young Australian Best Book Award (1994)

Film, TV or theatrical adaptations
Plans to adapt The Gathering into screen began circulating as far back as 1997, when Sullivan Entertainment picked up the idea. In 2001, the Variety website posted an article stating that the film adaptation of The Gathering, to be titled "New Haven", was to be part of a three-film production plan for the then newly created film division of Sullivan Entertainment. Despite speculation and rumours amongst fans, no news has been reported since, and the project status is unknown.

Release details
1993, Australia, Puffin Books Aust. , Pub date 1993, paperback (First edition)
1994, Australia, Puffin Books Aust. , Pub date 15 April 1994, paperback
1994, Australia, Dial Books for Young Readers , Pub date ? June 1994, hardback
1999, USA, Bolinda Audio , Pub date 31 December 1999, audio cassette (narrated by Peter Hardy )
2001, UK, Barn Owl Books , Pub date 1 April 2001, paperback

References

External links
Review of The Gathering
Isobelle Carmody Fansite

1993 Australian novels
Young adult fantasy novels
Australian young adult novels
Australian fantasy novels
1993 fantasy novels
Novels by Isobelle Carmody
CBCA Children's Book of the Year Award-winning works